Jonathan Fritz (born November 30, 1976) is an American politician who has served in the Pennsylvania House of Representatives from the 111th district since 2017.

Fritz currently sits on the Appropriations, Finance, Gaming Oversight, Insurance, and Rules committees.

References

1976 births
Living people
American people of German descent
Republican Party members of the Pennsylvania House of Representatives
21st-century American politicians